Tour of Azerbaijan 2006 was the 21st running of the Tour of Iran (Azerbaijan), which took place between 22 May and 29 May 2006 in Iranian Azerbaijan. The tour had 7 stages, in which Ghader Mizbani from Iran won the first place in over all of the tour.

Stages of the tour

General classification

References

Tour of Azerbaijan (Iran)